Selma Kajan (born 30 July 1991) is an Australian athlete who specialises in middle-distance running. She qualified for the 2016 Summer Olympics. Kajan has competed at the IAAF World Youth Championships. In 2012, she graduated from University of New South Wales. She is of Bosnian descent.

Personal bests

Outdoor

References

External links 
 

1991 births
Living people
Australian female middle-distance runners
Athletes (track and field) at the 2016 Summer Olympics
Olympic athletes of Australia